Handy Andy Home Improvement Centers was founded as Arrow Lumber Company by Joseph Rashkow in 1947 on the south side of Chicago. His son, Ronald Rashkow, bought out the single store operation in 1967 from his father. He converted the company to Handy Andy in 1971 with its first expansion unit. The company grew to 72 stores in seven American states (Illinois, Wisconsin, Indiana, Ohio, Missouri, Mississippi, Michigan, Tennessee, and Kentucky). At its peak, the company had approximately 11,000 employees and annual revenue of $750 million. The chain advertised with the phrase "Handy Andy, you've got it made". The company's core product mix included hardware, lumber, building materials, home decor, kitchen/bath and lawn/garden. The stores were highly visible and well known for their very large vertical stripes of brown and white that would typically cover the entire building.

Acquisitions 
In 1979, Handy Andy acquired four Republic Lumber store locations from Jewel Food Stores in the Chicago market.

In 1986, Handy Andy acquired six Mr. HOW stores from Nashville, Tennessee-based Service Merchandise in the Chicago area.  The stores were later renamed.

In 1987, Handy Andy acquired the Forest City lumber chain with stores in Ohio, Michigan, and Illinois from Forest City Enterprises.

In 1989, Handy Andy acquired 21 Central Hardware store locations in Missouri, Kentucky, and Ohio plus Witte Wholesale Hardware from Interco.

Bankruptcy 
Handy Andy declared bankruptcy on October 17, 1995, due to creditor pressures, which led to the closure of about 20 of its stores.  At that time, Handy Andy had over $120 million in debt and was planning to reorganize into hardware supermarkets.  In early 1996, however, creditors forced Handy Andy to liquidate its assets to repay its outstanding debts.  On January 25, 1996, Handy Andy announced it would be closing its remaining 54 stores, laying off over 2,500 employees. By June 1996, Handy Andy Home Improvement Centers had ceased to exist.

Richard George was president of Handy Andy Home Improvement Centers. He was at the helm at the time of Handy Andy's bankruptcy on October 17, 1995, and for the company's closure in June 1996.

References 

Defunct companies based in Illinois
Economy of the Midwestern United States
Defunct retail companies of the United States
Hardware stores of the United States
Home improvement retailers of the United States
Retail companies established in 1947
Retail companies disestablished in 1996
Companies that filed for Chapter 11 bankruptcy in 1995